The Entombment usually refers to the entombment, or burial, of Jesus.

The Entombment may also refer to these works of art:
The Entombment (Bouts), a glue-size painting on linen attributed to Dirk Bouts
The Entombment (Delacroix), a copy of Titian's earlier work on the subject by Eugene Delacroix
The Entombment (Michelangelo), an unfinished painting of the placing of the body of Jesus in the garden tomb
The Entombment (Pontormo) or The Deposition from the Cross, an altarpiece by Jacopo Pontormo, completed in 1528
The Entombment (Titian, 1525)
The Entombment (Titian, 1559)
The Entombment of Christ (Caravaggio)
The Deposition (Raphael) or The Entombment, an oil painting by Raphael

See also
Tomb of Jesus
Entombment or burial
Entombed (disambiguation)
Lamentation of Christ